Hanna Andreyeuna Huskova (born 28 August 1992) is a Belarusian freestyle skier specializing in aerials. She competed at the FIS Freestyle Ski and Snowboarding World Championships 2015, where she qualified for the aerials final, and placed sixth in the final. At the 2014 Olympics, she placed 21st in aerials. She won a gold medal at the 2018 Olympics, and won silver at the 2022 Olympics, in  Women's aerials.

References

External links

Belarusian female freestyle skiers
1992 births
Living people
Freestyle skiers at the 2014 Winter Olympics
Freestyle skiers at the 2018 Winter Olympics
Freestyle skiers at the 2022 Winter Olympics
Olympic freestyle skiers of Belarus
Medalists at the 2018 Winter Olympics
Medalists at the 2022 Winter Olympics
Olympic gold medalists for Belarus
Olympic silver medalists for Belarus
Olympic medalists in freestyle skiing
Sportspeople from Minsk